Creative Book Publishers International is one of two special imprints of the international Marketing and Publicity Specialist Communication Projects International, the other imprint being Global Book Publishers.

The imprints were created in 2006 by the Beverly Hills-based parent consultancy which saw a need for both traditional and non-traditional book marketing. Both imprints focus primarily on non-fiction with exceptions made for unique and special fiction projects that can benefit from the company's unique marketing and promotional talents. Principals of the company have held major marketing executive titles at several leading entertainment groups, including Warner Bros. and 20th Century Fox.

Notable titles 
As a natural spinoff of its many connections with the entertainment world, Creative Book Publishers International has published a variety of titles by people such as the writer, producer and director Stephen Verona (The Making of The Lords of Flatbush), the  sports broadcaster Tony Verna (Instant Replay: the Day That Changed Sports Forever), the movie producer Ed Feldman (Tell Me How You Love the Picture) and the publicist Leonard Morpurgo (Of Kings and Queens and Movie Stars).

Also related are titles about entertainment world celebrities such as Glenn Miller (The Glenn Miller Conspiracy:  The Never-Before-Told True Story of his Live and Death by Lt. Col. Hunton Downs, US Army, Ret.), as well as books about the movies themselves (The Making Of A Classic, Margaret Mitchell and Gone With The Wind by Sally Tippett Rains.)

Book publishing companies based in California